Opharus insulsa is a moth of the family Erebidae. It was described by Paul Dognin in 1902. It is found in Ecuador.

References

Opharus
Moths described in 1902
Moths of South America